The Brisbane Lions' 2003 season was its seventh season in the Australian Football League (AFL). In it, the club won its third consecutive premiership, and third overall.

Season summary

Premiership Season

Home and away season

Finals series

Second qualifying final

Second semi final

First preliminary final

Grand Final

Ladder

References

Brisbane Lions Season, 2003
Brisbane Lions seasons